Hen Gaer is an Iron Age hillfort, on a hill adjacent to and east of Bow Street, Ceredigion, Wales.

Other names of the hillfort are Broncastellan and Caer Shon.

Description
Hen Gaer ("Old Castle") is smaller than a typical tribal fortification. On the north-east side, carefully laid stone blocks of the original rampart wall can be seen. The main entrance is on the west side. There is a circular mound outside the entrance: it is not an earlier barrow, but may be a defensive feature.

The enclosed area includes some of the southern hillslope; it is thought this may have been to make the fortification visible from the narrow valley below, at the confluence of Afon Stewi and Nant Seilo forming Afon Clarach.

See also
 Hillforts in Britain
 List of Scheduled prehistoric Monuments in Ceredigion

References

Hillforts in Ceredigion
Scheduled monuments in Wales